Myzinum quinquecinctum, the five-banded thynnid wasp, is a species of thynnid wasp in the family Thynnidae, found mainly in North America east of the Rocky Mountains.

References

External links

 

Thynnidae